USS PC-1641 was an  in the United States Navy during the Cold War. She was transferred to the Turkish Navy as TCG Akhisar (P 114) of the Hisar-class patrol boat.

Construction and commissioning 
PC-1641 was laid down on 29 May 1963 at Gunderson Brothers Engineering Corps., Portland, Oregon. Launched on 14 May 1964.

She was transferred to the Turkish Navy and renamed TCG Akhisar (P 114).

Further reading 

 Navsource.org

References

PC-1638-class submarine chasers
1964 ships
Ships transferred from the United States Navy to the Turkish Navy
Ships built in Portland, Oregon